Willie Smith (25 January 1886 – 2 June 1982) was an English professional player of snooker and English billiards. Smith was, according to an article on the English Amateur Billiards Association's website, "by common consent, the greatest all-round billiards player who ever lived".

He studied previous Billiard players such as Melbourne Inman, Harry Stevenson, Tom Reece, Edward Diggle and George Gray, describing his play as "the combination of Gray's striking and Diggle's top-of-the-table play". Smith became a professional player in 1913.

He entered the World Billiards Championship in 1920 and then again in 1923, winning it on both occasions.  Arguments with the governing body prevented him from taking part in the competition more often.

In 1930 he started writing for The Burwat Billiard Review, a magazine published by the Cue Sport Manufacturers Burroughes and Watts. These were instructional articles with accompanying illustrations and photographs.

He turned to snooker for purely monetary reasons but never really took to the game. His natural talent as a billiards player still enabled him to reach the World Snooker Championship final in 1933 and 1935 where he was beaten by Joe Davis.

References

1886 births
1982 deaths
English snooker players
English players of English billiards
Sportspeople from Darlington
World champions in English billiards